Yuri Borisov may refer to:

 Yury Borisov (born 1956), Russian politician, deputy prime minister
 Yury Borisov (scientist) (1923–2006), Soviet-Russian radio scientist
 Yuri Borisov (actor) (born 1992), Russian actor